Polish National Districts (called in Russian "полрайоны", polrajony, an abbreviation for "польские национальные районы", "Polish national raions") were  in the interbellum period possessing some form of a national autonomy in the Ukrainian and Byelorussian Soviet Socialist Republics of the USSR. They were created in an attempt to live up to the postulate of  Leninism about the rights of nations for self-determination. Also, creation of these regions served one of purposes of the Bolsheviks to export the revolution since after their defeat in the Polish-Soviet War, the Soviets did not give up their idea of creating a Soviet Republic in Poland. Polish National Districts were supposed to be the origin of future Soviet Poland, but they both were disbanded in mid-1930s and their populations expelled to Kazakhstan, with many of them killed during the Great Purge.

Origins
The possibility of granting autonomy to Polish-populated areas of the Soviet Union was discussed during the Polish-Soviet war by key persons involved in the Provisional Polish Revolutionary Committee. However, there were no plans to create whole districts; autonomy would be granted to separate villages. In 1925 it was decided that a district would be created in Soviet Ukraine, where, according to the 1926 survey, 476,435 Poles lived. This was 1.6% of the Ukrainian population, but in the Zhitomir Oblast, their number reached 10%. Among persons who supported the district were Soviet communists of Polish origin, such as Feliks Kon, Julian Marchlewski, Felix Dzerzhinsky and Tomasz Dąbal. Thus Marchlewszczyzna was created, and later Dzierżyńszczyzna.

Marchlewszczyzna 

Marchlewszczyzna was the Polish National District (Мархлевский польский национальный район) in Ukraine created as an experiment and as part of the Soviet Korenizatsia campaign on 21 July 1925 in Zhytomyr Okruha on resolution of Little Presidium of the All-Ukrainian Central Executive Committee. Its capital the town of Dovbysh, later in 1926, was renamed as Marchlewsk. The district was one of 32 other national districts that were created in the Ukrainian SSR during that period (1924-1939). Creation of the district was based on standards adopted by the fourth session of the All-Ukrainian Central Executive Committee (15-19 February 1925) and recommendations of Central Commission in affairs of National Minorities at that executive committee. It was created to implement an idea in creation of Polish national districts on territories of Ukrainian and Belarusian SSRs.

The district was located far away from railroad in which numerically dominated settlements of khutir type (farmsteads). Village Dovbysh was a small settlement around porcelain factory. The district did not have telephone and telegraph communications and by general estimates it was economically backwards. At the beginning stage the district was composed of 26 rural communities (so called selsoviet) with general area of 620 km2. Later 108 populated places were united into 34 communities (30 Polish, 2 Ukrainian, 2 German). In percentage relation the population consisted of 68.8% of Polish people, 19.2% of Ukrainians, 8.8% of Germans, 2.5% of Jews, 0.5% of Russians. In 1932 the number of communities increased to 38 with 34 being Polish.

Official opening ceremony of the district took place on 27 March 1926 with participation of Felix Dzerzhinsky, Feliks Kon, Samuil Lazovert, Boleslav Skarbek, Józef Unszlicht at the First district congress of Soviets (27-30 April 1926) where in total took part 103 delegates and 500 visitors. The newly created district received valuable presents: from Moscow Factory "Tribuna" were 2 tractors with ploughs, from "Pratsia" association – radio receivers, from Polish department of the People's Commissariat of Enlightenment of the Ukrainian SSR – otoscopes. In 1927 took place the Second congress of Soviets of Marchlewski District at which were present Tomasz Dąbal, Samuil Lazovert, Boleslav Skarbek. During celebration of the tenth anniversary of 1917 October Revolution the Polish District was visited by Polish delegation.

As a type of Soviet propaganda, the subdivision was located just  from the eastern border of the Second Polish Republic and was named after the Polish Bolshevik Julian Marchlewski, who was a rector of the Communist University of the National Minorities of the West and dreamed of Poland becoming part of the Soviet Union. The Marchlewszczyzna had to become an exemplary autonomous district where Bolsheviks sought to demonstrate to their western neighbor Poland that Polish as nation also will submit to "government of workers and peasants". Function of the Polish District had boldly expressed political composition. About that more than once had spoken the leader of Polish section of the Central Commission in affairs of National Minorities Jan Saulewicz.

The raion was established out of the already existing Pulyny Raion. Later in 1930 the rest of Pulyny Raion was transformed into German National District. Soon after the establishment of Marchlewski Polish National District, territorial division by governorates in the Ukrainian SSR was abolished and Marchlewszczyzna became part at first of Zhytomyr Okruha and after establishing of Kyiv Oblast in 1932 part of Novohrad Volynskyi Okruha.

In the initial years of the district's existence, local Poles enjoyed limited autonomy, with 55 Polish-language schools, 80 reading rooms and a Polish daily Marchlewszczyzna Radziecka (Soviet Marchlewszczyzna). At the same time, its inhabitants were subject to intense communist propaganda. Polish grammar rules, regarded as bourgeoisie, were changed; however, the district lacked educated people. The majority of its inhabitants were Catholic peasants who were not interested in communist ideas. Therefore, such persons as Tomasz Dąbal were brought there to propagate atheism. An organization named the Polish Anti-Catholic Section was also founded.

As one of Dovbysh residents recall, after local elections some newly elected officials were soon arrested and taken away in "Chornyi voronok" (a special NKVD car that was used to carry detained). Among such was father of Halyna (Helena) Trybel, Jan Trybel who spent in exile 20 years. Halyna Trybel happened to be a mother of Yuriy Yekhanurov.

Soviet authorities, who wanted to create Polish laborers, future citizens of the Polish Soviet Republic, built several factories as well as power plants and telephone lines. This also brought about improvement in the quality of life, but all efforts were destroyed in the early 1930s, when collectivization began (see collectivization in the Soviet Union). Polish peasants opposed it fiercely, and thousands of them perished in the Holodomor (Enforced famine).

Initially, ethnic Poles constituted around 70% of district's population, which in 1926 totalled around 41,000. Other inhabitants were Ukrainians (20%), Germans (7%) and Jews. In 1930, after several adjacent villages were added to Marchlewszczyzna, the population grew to 52,000, with Poles still constituting 70%. It has been estimated that the district consisted of around 100 villages, settlements and smaller towns.

In 1935 on resolution of the Central Executive Committee of the Soviet Union (signed by Grigoriy Petrovskiy) the Polish national raion was abolished and split between newly formed Chervonoarmiyskyi Raion and Baranivka Raion, Kyiv Oblast, while some communities were also transferred to either Novohrad-Volynskyi or Zhytomyr municipalities. In Zhytomyr Oblast former Marchlewszczyzna appeared upon creation of the oblast in 1938.

Soon after dissolution of the Soviet Union, since 1996 in local town school Polish language is being taught once again on efforts of the local Polish Society of Jan Paul II. Already in 1990 in Dovbysh was revived local Catholic parish.

Dzierżyńszczyzna 

Dzierżyńszczyzna was a Polish National District (Дзержинский польский национальный район, Dzierzhynsky Polish national district) in Belarus, near Minsk and close to the Soviet-Polish border of the time. It was created on March 15, 1932, with its capital at Dzierżyńsk (formerly known as Kojdanava , so that initially it was established as "Kojdanovsky Polish national district"). It was named after the Cheka director Felix Dzerzhinsky.

Similarly to Marchlewszczyzna, limited Polish autonomy in the area was a real fact, with Polish-language schools, libraries and institutions. At the same time, the inhabitants were subject to intensive communist propaganda. Religious life was suppressed, and the campaign of collectivization, carried out in mid-1930s, met resistance of local Polish peasants. Unlike Marchlewszczyzna, which was the real center of Polish cultural life in the Soviet Union, Dzierżyńszczyzna's influence was limited.

Disbanding 

Polish districts were among those which resisted Soviet collectivization and atheization. For political reasons, drastic measures were initially not applied in these areas. Eventually, Marchlewszczyzna was disbanded in 1935 at the onset of the Great Purge and most of the administration was executed. In the following years, many men were shot (111,091 according to NKVD 00485 Order, women and children deported to Kazakhstan and other remote areas of the Soviet Union.

Dzierżyńszczyzna  was disbanded in 1937.

All Polish schools and libraries were closed, Tomasz Dąbal was executed in 1938.

After World War II, in both Polish and Soviet historiographies, the existence of the districts was omitted, perhaps because the authorities of both countries wanted to avoid uneasy questions about sudden rejection of the Leninist postulate of the rights of nations for self-determination.

The area of Marchlewszczyzna is still inhabited by the Polish minority, in the town of Dovbysh they make half of the population. There are also Poles in Dzierżyńszczyzna.

See also
Polish operation of the NKVD
Population transfer in the Soviet Union
German Districts

References

 Mikolaj Iwanow, Pierwszy naród ukarany. Polacy w Związku Radzieckim 1921-1939 (The first nation to be punished: Poles in the USSR, 1921-1939), Warsaw-Wroclaw. Panstwowe Wydawnictwo Naukowe. 1991. 
 Nikołaj Iwanow, Zapomniane ludobójstwo. Polacy w państwie Stalina. „Operacja polska” 1937–1938, Znak Horyzont, Kraków 2014

Geographic history of Belarus
Geographic history of Ukraine
Subdivisions of the Soviet Union
20th century in Ukraine
1930s in Belarus
Ethnic Poles in the Soviet Union